Asle Strand (29 September 1953 – 9 June 2000) was a Norwegian luger who competed in the mid-1970s. He won the silver medal in the men's doubles event at the 1976 FIL European Luge Championships in Hammarstrand, Sweden.

Strand also finished 13th in the men's doubles event at the 1976 Winter Olympics in Innsbruck.

Death

While recording a film of his methods in the Lyngen Alps in Trom, Norway, Strand was mortally wounded during a practice run and died several days later on 9 June 2000.

References
1976 Winter Olympic men's doubles results.
List of European luge champions 
Asle Strand's profile at Sports Reference.com
Profile at Olympics site

Lugers at the 1976 Winter Olympics
Lugers at the 1984 Winter Olympics
Norwegian male lugers
1953 births
2000 deaths
Olympic lugers of Norway